John James Bentham (born 3 March 1963) is an English former professional footballer who played as a winger in the Football League for York City and was on the books of Bolton Wanderers as an associate schoolboy.

References

1963 births
Living people
People from South Elmsall
English footballers
Association football wingers
Bolton Wanderers F.C. players
York City F.C. players
English Football League players
Footballers from Yorkshire